Oluwatosin "Tosyn" Bucknor (15 August 1981 – 19 November 2018) was a Nigerian writer, singer-songwriter, radio and television host, social media content creator and a Vlogger who died of sickle cell anaemia. Until her death, she worked with Inspiration FM as a journalist and also ran ‘These Genes Project’ to help people with sickle cell anaemia.

Early life and education 
Tosyn was born to Sola Bucknor and Segun Bucknor, a musician, in a cab on 15 August 1981. She was sister to Funke Bucknor, CEO of Zapphaire Events. Tosyn attended Fountain Nursery and Primary School, Queens' College Yaba, University of Lagos (LLB) and the Nigerian Law School, Lagos Campus (BL). She did her National Youth Service Corps at Port Harcourt, opting to teach Literature-In-English and English at Archdeacon Crowther Memorial Girls' School, Elelenwo.

Career

Radio 
Radio for Tosyn started with Tee A on Eko 89.7FM after which she interned at Cool FM Nigeria where she hosted the Fun Hour Show on Saturdays. In 2009, Tosyn joined Top Radio 90.9 FM where she hosted the morning show, "Top Of The Morning" until 2017. She was the only female radio host handling the morning belt by herself. In 2018, Tosyn moved to join Inspiration FM, Lagos where she was until she passed. Apart from Radio, Tosyn was an avid podcaster. She created "OAP 101" for aspiring media personalities.

Music 
Tosyn was a singer-songwriter with one album ('Pop Rock Soul and Jara'). Two of her songs have been used as soundtracks for the short film "Ireti". Tosyn wrote, sang, recorded and performed music as CON.tra.diction. As a recording artist and singer-songwriter, she has worked with artists like Skales, Rooftop MCs and Eva, as well as producers like Sess, Tintin, Coldflames, Dj Klem, Knighthouse, Micworx and Cobhams.

Music credits 
– Performed at Naijazz, Laff and Jamz, Swe Hip hop Valentine, Muson Jazz Festival, Trip City and Friends, My Groovy Valentine, Wax Lyrical, Inspiration Fm Family Festival, Fashion Show at Rehab, One Soul's Album Launch, Music For Soul at Ember Creek, Koffi's Green Zone at Unilag, ONE MIC NAIJA.

– Contributed a verse to the voter's awareness song organised by '1 Thumb'

– CON.tra.diction did a cameo of ‘Sorry Song’ on Plumbline's video "Dead presidents"

– Featured on Micworx Music E-mixes mixtape alongside Darey, Asa, Goldie and others

Tosyn also ran ONE MIC NAIJA with Moyo Shomade & Osagie Okunkpolor. One Mic Naija is a concert dedicated to getting new and established acts on the same stage.

Television 
Bucknor hosted 'Tosyn's Buzz Live' on Pulse TV every Friday. Her television and acting credits include:
 Co-host 3Live Chicks with Oreka Godis and Toke Makinwa (a TV and YouTube show)
 Television Correspondent for EbonyLife Television
 Guest judge on Naija Sings Season 1
 Guest judge on Project Fame West Africa Season 5
 Judge on Boost Freestyle Reality Show Season 2
 Mentor on Project Fame West Africa Season 2
 Mentor on Project Fame West Africa Season 5
 Judge on God's Kids Great Talent, City Of David, Redeemed Christian Church of God. 2012
 Judge on Greensprings Pastoral Centre Talent Show (PC's Got Talent), Greensprings School, Lekki. 2012
 Plays "Osa" on TINSEL, a Mnet soap opera
 The Survivor Show with DJ Neptune as Host DJ
 Played 'Jola' on 'Plus 234', a television drama series
 She was the brain behind the 'One Mic Naija" project

Writing credits 
Tosyn contributed to several websites, including her own blogs, and wrote for television. Her writing credits include (but not limited to):
 Series writer, '5ve' television series
 Series writer, 'Apprentice Africa'
 Series writer, 'Xtraconnect Gameshow'
 Columnist for the Guardian on Sundays for the column, 'Strictly for the Young'
 Columnist for Wedding Planner Magazine
 Columnist for Exquisite Magazine
 Series writer and Content Producer, 'Nigeria's Got Talent' Season 1
 Columnist for The Net NG (Tosyn's ten 10s)
 Series contributor, "My Mum and I"
 Series contributor, "Citi Sistas"
 Series contributor, "About to Wed"
 Writer Amstel Malta Box Office (seasons 2 to 5) and Voice Over narrator for Season 5
 Website writer for Gulder Ultimate Search Season 3

Personal life
Tosyn married her French boyfriend Aurélien Boyer 15 November 2015 at Landmark Events Centre, Oniru. She publicly maintained close friendships with Lamide Akintobi Gbemi Olateru-Olagbegi and Lala Akindoju.

Death 
Tosyn was found dead by her husband, Aurelien Boyer, when he arrived at home from work on 19 November 2018. Her sister, Funke Bucknor Obruthe said through her instagram account that Tosyn died due to sickle cell complications. She was born with sickle cell anaemia.
Following her death, a poem she had written a few days before her death surfaced online, where she apparently predicted her death.

Recognitions and awards 
 Nominee, Women in Media Awards 2009
 Nominee, Exquisite Lady of the Year Award 2009, 2010, 2011
 Nominee, Future Awards, Best Use of Goodwill 2009
 Nominee, Dynamix Awards, Radio Personality of the Year 2009, 2011
 Nominee, Future Awards, On-Air Personality of the Year, Radio 2010
 Nominee, FAB Awards, On-Air Personality, Radio 2011, 2012
 Nominee, Dynamix Awards Best Radio Personality 2011
 Nominee, Nickelodeon Kids Choice Awards, Favourite On-Air Personality (Nigeria) 2015
 Nominee, OAP of the Year, SCREAM Awards 2016
 Nominee, Most Fashionable On-Air Personality, Lagos Fashion Awards 2016
 Winner, Best of Nollywood Awards, Radio Host of the Year
 Winner, Tweet Rave Awards, Most Innovative Tweets
 Winner, Jeans 4 Genes II, Best charity/cause-related event at Nigerian Events Award
 Winner, Nigerian Broadcasters Awards: Most Popular Radio Presenter
 As CON.tra.diction, Tosyn was nominated at the NMVA Awards 2010 in the Best Rock Video category
 Tosyn was inducted into the Humanitarian Hall of Fame by Charity Lounge, Lagos for her 'Act of Kindness' 2012

Advocacy and goodwill
 Supported youth organizations like Rise Nigeria, The Future Nigeria
 Ran a sickle cell project, These Genes
 Supported several Election Awareness campaigns like Enough is Enough Nigeria, 1 Thumb Nigeria
 Volunteered for Support an Orphan project, SAMi and CASAP (Child Adoption and Sponsorship Awareness Project)

References

Nigerian radio presenters
People from Lagos State
Nigerian soul musicians
University of Lagos alumni
Rappers from Lagos
Queen's College, Lagos alumni
1981 births
Tosyn
Deaths from sickle-cell disease
Nigerian television actresses
2018 deaths
Nigerian women radio presenters
Nigerian radio personalities